The Reed reaction is a chemical reaction that utilizes light to oxidize hydrocarbons to alkylsulfonyl chlorides. This reaction is employed in modifying polyethylene to give  chlorosulfonated polyethylene (CSPE), which noted for its toughness.

Commercial implementations

Polyethylene is treated with a mixture of chlorine and sulfur dioxide under UV-radiation.  Vinylsulfonic acid can also be prepared beginning with the sulfochlorination of chloroethane. Dehydrohalogenation of the product gives  vinylsulfonyl chloride, which subsequently is hydrolyzed to give vinylsulfonic acid:

=

==

Mechanism
The reaction occurs via a free radical mechanism.  UV-light initiates homolysis of chlorine, producing a pair of chlorine atoms: 

Chain initiation:
Cl2 ->[h\nu] 2Cl. 

Thereafter a chlorine atom attacks the hydrocarbon chain, freeing hydrogen to form hydrogen chloride and an alkyl free radical.  The resulting radical then captures SO2.  The resulting sulfonyl radical attacks another chlorine molecule to produce the desired sulfonyl chloride and a new chlorine atom, which continues the reaction chain.
Chain propagation steps:
{R-H} + .Cl -> {R.} + HCl
{R.} + {:}SO2 -> R-\dot{S}O2
{R-\dot{S}O2} + Cl2 -> {R-SO2-Cl} + Cl.

See also
 Chain reaction

Historical readings
 Reed, C. F. ; ; .

References

Substitution reactions
Carbon-heteroatom bond forming reactions
Name reactions